Roger Bens (born 27 May 1958) is the French singer who represented France in the Eurovision Song Contest 1985 with the song Femme dans ses rêves aussi. He came tenth with 56 points.

Prior to 1985, he tried to represent France in the 1984 contest as part of the duo Victoire.

References

1958 births
Living people
Eurovision Song Contest entrants of 1985
Eurovision Song Contest entrants for France
French male singers